The Conchas Dam Historic District, in Conchas Dam, New Mexico, is a  historic district which was listed on the National Register of Historic Places in 2005. The district is roughly bounded by the State Park South Area, State Park North Area, Conchas Reservoir, and Bell Ranch.  It included six contributing buildings, 11 contributing structures, two contributing objects, and a contributing site.

Year of construction: 1935
Architect: US Army Corps of Engineers; et al.
Architecture: Art Deco
Historic function: Government; Recreation And Culture
Historic subfunction: Public Works; Outdoor Recreation
Criteria: event, architecture/engineering

References

National Register of Historic Places in San Miguel County, New Mexico
Historic districts on the National Register of Historic Places in New Mexico
Art Deco architecture in New Mexico
Buildings and structures completed in 1935